Miitopia is a role-playing video game developed and published by Nintendo originally for the Nintendo 3DS. The 3DS version was released in Japan in 2016 and worldwide the following year, with a remastered version being released for the Nintendo Switch in 2021. The game features customizable Mii characters in a turn-based battle system, following the story of a group of heroes battling a character known as the Dark Lord (and later the Darker Lord) who is stealing the faces of Miitopia's residents. The game received mixed reviews, with critics praising its creative life simulation elements and humor while criticizing its combat system and repetitiveness.

Gameplay

Miitopia is a role-playing video game with life simulation elements, starting with standard character classes or "jobs" such as warriors and mages; as the game progresses, more classes appear. Playable characters are created with Mii avatar and have certain personality traits which influence their role in combat. Similarly to Tomodachi Life, the relationships between Miis outside of combat affects the game: for example, Miis not getting along with one another can make combat more difficult. Miitopia supports the ability to import Miis and their trait settings from Tomodachi Life, as well as from a player's friend list.

The game supports Nintendo's line of Amiibo figures, which allow players to use unique cosmetics on their Miis. The Nintendo Switch remaster also introduces a new makeup and wig feature which allows players to further customize their in-game characters, including options not available on the console's Mii Maker application. The Switch remaster also includes a horse that can help in combat, outings that let your characters gain relationship EXP, and a secret final dungeon after the Tower of Dread, the Tower of Despair, yet all of these are not included in the 3DS version.

Plot 

The game begins with the main protagonist, a Mii of the player's choice, arriving in Greenhorne Town, which is soon attacked by the main antagonist, the Dark Lord, who wields the ability to steal faces from Miis and use them to control peaceful creatures, turning the creatures into monsters. The protagonist chooses a character class and is sent on a journey to stop the Dark Lord. Along their journey, the player creates more companions, meets the Great Sage, and reaches Greenhorne castle, continuing the quest after the Dark Lord steals the faces of the King and the Princess. Afterwards, the team enters the kingdom of Neksdor, only to be attacked by the Dark Lord, who steals the protagonist's companions and renders the protagonist without a class. After the guardian provides the hero with new powers, they head out through Neksdor, meeting three new companions and the Genie of the Lamp. The team continues to the Realm of the Fey, where the Dark Lord attacks again, stealing the hero's companions and their character class again, prompting the guardian to provide a new group of character classes. The hero is tasked with saving the three Fab Fairies of the Realm, who provide the team the way to the Dark Lord's castle in Karkaton. Before they can open the door, the Fab Fairies have their faces stolen by the Dark Lord. After retrieving their faces, the Fab Fairies open the door to Karkaton, and the team head out. Upon arrival, the Dark Lord attacks again, stealing the new companions, but failing to steal the hero's powers. The hero is tasked with saving all of their friends, with some help from the Great Sage.

The team fights the Dark Lord, and upon defeating them, the heroes discover that the Dark Lord was a common Mii possessed by a small blue wisp known as the Dark Curse. Enraged, the Dark Curse tries to possess the player's Mii, until the Great Sage intervenes and becomes possessed instead, becoming the Darker Lord. After this you have the ability to swap between classes, which also includes classes that the Dark Lord had restricted your hero from. The hero and their team track down the Darker Lord through the lands of Powdered Peaks, Peculia and Nimbus, before reaching the Darker Lord's Domain in The Sky Scraper, fighting previous bosses along the way. Upon reaching the top of The Sky Scraper, the heroes go to the Otherworld for the final showdown against the Darker Lord. The hero and their team are then prompted to split up to fight the Darker Lord. Afterwards, the Darker Lord steals the faces of six heroes, evolving into the Darkest Lord for the fight with the last four members. After the Darkest Lord is defeated, the Great Sage is free. The Sage quickly traps the Dark Curse, and explains its history to the hero: it was once a normal Mii, rejected due to having a boring face, which they then decide to get rid of, and they faded away into a soul of hatred, malice and evil, which became the Dark Curse. The hero is given an opportunity to either destroy the Dark Curse or provide them with a new face and body. If the hero provides the Dark Curse with a new life, the Great Sage takes the Curse and travels with them to have them atone for their mistakes while the team is praised for saving Miitopia. If the hero decides to destroy the Dark Curse, they use their divine power to destroy the Dark Curse, in which they are also praised for saving Miitopia. After the credits, the player unlocks two post-game areas: Galados Isle and New Lumos. The player can also unlock the Elf and Vampire fighting class after doing certain quests. However, the Vampire fighting class can be unlocked under certain circumstances before the game is beaten.

Reception

Miitopia received mixed or average reviews from critics, according to review aggregator Metacritic. Famitsu awarded both versions a score of 31/40. 

Many critics have drawn comparisons between Miitopia and Tomodachi Life due to the two involving Miis and having similar mechanics, despite having different premises. Jeff Cork of Game Informer described Miitopia as a hybrid between Tomodachi Life and an old-school RPG, allowing for a "simple but effective" player experience. While Jonathan Leack from GameRevolution draws a similar comparison between Miitopia and Tomodachi Life, his opinion of the former was less favorable, noting that the interactions between characters in Miitopia were "let down by uninteresting writing", and were far less humorous as compared to Tomodachi Life. 

Another criticism of Leack's is the lack of player involvement. Due to a lack of player choices while exploring Miitopia'''s various game areas, Leack described feeling as though the game was on autopilot for the majority of its playtime. Similarly, Heidi Kemps of GameSpot felt as though Miitopia was a "slow slog you mostly watch rather than play", and Jon Mundy of Pocket Gamer discussed the lack of challenge and player input in the gameplay. Allegra Frank of Polygon agreed to an extent, saying that the game often let the Miis "do their thing", but found that this was often still enough to keep her entertained. Frank highlighted that the uninvolved segments of the game were balanced out by its overall dynamic nature, saying that the game periodically shaking up the entire cast, map, and combat occurred often enough to keep her engaged.

Despite the combat being an essential part of the game, it was not universally praised. Leack criticized the unchallenging combat in the earlier stages, while Frank criticized the high frequency of battles leading to repetitive gameplay. The existence of an auto-battle mechanic mitigated this issue, but did not completely solve it. Equally criticized was the AI which controlled all the Miis in combat, save for the player's own Mii. Kemps and Frank both noted that a lack of player control over the battle party's actions could lead to frustrating gameplay. Nevertheless, Frank praised the creative "hidden intricacies" of the turn-based battle system, due to characters' jobs and personality traits having impacts on their combat style. 

Creativity is what most critics cite to be Miitopia's greatest asset. Cork, Kemps, Leack, and Frank agree that the creative spin on a more traditional RPG concept is ultimately the highlight of the game.

Sales
By February 2017, the 3DS version had sold over 168,000 copies in Japan.

During its first week in the UK, the Switch port sold 36% more copies at launch than the 3DS version, debuting at #2 behind Resident Evil Village. In Japan, the Switch port launched at #2 behind Rune Factory 5 with 72,725 physical copies sold, three times the sales of the 3DS version. By its second week of release, the Miitopia Switch port surpassed competition to take the #1 weekly sales spot in Japan, with 34,451 physical copies sold. According to Media Create, the Switch port debuted at #1 in South Korea.

As of March 2022, the Nintendo Switch version had sold 1.63 million copies worldwide.

Legacy
Two music tracks from Miitopia, "Boss Battle" and "Boss: The Darkest Lord", were featured in the crossover fighting game Super Smash Bros. Ultimate''. A Nintendo Switch port of the game, developed by Grezzo, was released on May 21, 2021.

Notes

References

External links

2016 video games
Single-player video games
Social simulation video games
Nintendo Entertainment Planning & Development games
Nintendo games
Nintendo 3DS games
Nintendo Switch games
Role-playing video games
Video games developed in Japan
Fantasy video games
Video games about magic
Video games featuring protagonists of selectable gender
Video games that use Amiibo figurines
Nintendo 3DS eShop games